Freund Publishing House is an academic publisher of books and scientific journals.

External links
 

Publishing companies of Israel
Academic publishing companies
Book publishing companies of Israel